The 2022–23 season is the 128th in Oldham Athletic's history and the club's first season outside the Football League since 1906-07. The club will compete in the National League, the FA Cup and the FA Trophy.

Pre-season commenced with uncertainty over the future of the club lingering following relegation from the Football League. Abdallah Lemsagam had announced in January 2022 that he was willing to sell Oldham Athletic, but no further announcement had been made as preparations began for the new season. On 24 May 2022 it was announced that only three of Boundary Park's stands would be in use during the 2022/23 season, with the North Stand remaining unopened.

Then, on the day that the new squad met to commence pre-season training, it was announced that Abdallah Lemsagam and Simon Blitz had agreed to sell both the football club (owned by Lemsagam) and the stadium and its surrounding land (owned by Blitz’s company Brass Bank Limited). The announcement stated that the target date for completion of the purchase was within four weeks and that the buyer would be a longstanding successful local business.

Frank Rothwell, the founder of Manchester Cabins, was announced as Oldham Athletic’s new owner and chairman on 28 July 2022. Rothwell was introduced at a media conference alongside his fellow directors Peter Norbury, Sue Schofield, Darren Royle and Joe Royle, as well as the club’s manager, John Sheridan.

The season therefore started with a positive atmosphere descending over Boundary Park, exemplified by the procession and celebrations which preceded the first home match, against Dorking Wanderers on 14 August 2022. However, following a sequence of indifferent results, it was announced on 15 September 2022 that manager John Sheridan would leave the club after the subsequent game against Eastleigh. Sheridan ended his long association with the club on a high after a last-gasp 3-2 win and was replaced three days later by David Unsworth.

Players

Current squad

Out on loan

Left the club during the season

Competitions
Oldham Athletic played in the National League in the 2022-23 season, the club's first season outside the Football League since 1906-07. It entered the FA Cup in the Fourth Qualifying Round and will take part in the FA Trophy, joining in the Third Round.

National League

League table

Results summary

Results by matchday

Matches
Oldham's fixtures were announced on 6 July 2022.

FA Cup

FA Trophy

Transfers

Transfers in

Transfers out

Loans in

Loans out

Squad statistics

Appearances
Players with no appearances are not included on the list.

Goals

Disciplinary Record

References

Oldham Athletic A.F.C. seasons